Adam Clark may refer to:

 Adam Christian Clark (born 1980), film director
 Adam Clark (engineer) (1811–1866), Scottish civil engineer
 Adam Clark (meteorologist), American meteorologist
 Adam Clark (actor), actor in Star Trek: Enterprise

See also
 Adam Clarke (disambiguation)